Baron Harding of Petherton, of Nether Compton in the County of Dorset, is a title in the Peerage of the United Kingdom. It was created in 1958 for Field Marshal Sir John Harding. He served as Chief of the Imperial General Staff from 1952 to 1955 and as Governor of Cyprus from 1955 to 1957. The title is now held by his grandson, the third Baron, who succeeded his father in 2016.

Diana "Dido" Harding, Baroness Harding of Winscombe, a businesswoman and Conservative life peer, is the daughter of the 2nd Baron.

Barons Harding of Petherton (1958)
(Allan Francis) John Harding, 1st Baron Harding of Petherton (1896–1989)
John Charles Harding, 2nd Baron Harding of Petherton (1928–2016)
William Alan John Harding, 3rd Baron Harding of Petherton (b. 1969)

The heir apparent is the present holder's son, the Hon. Angus John Edward Harding (b. 2001).

Line of succession

  Field Marshal (Allan Francis) John Harding, 1st Baron Harding of Petherton (1896–1989)
  John Charles Harding, 2nd Baron Harding of Petherton (1928–2016)
  William Allan John Harding, 3rd Baron Harding of Petherton (born 1969)
 (1) Hon. Angus John Edward Harding (b. 2001)
 (2) Hon. Mungo Richard John Harding (b. 2003)
 (3) Hon. David Richard John Harding (b. 1978)

Arms

Notes

References
 
 Burke's Peerage and Baronetage, 107th edn., (London 2003) 
 Debrett's Peerage (London 2002)

External links
 http://www.burkespeerage.net/

Baronies in the Peerage of the United Kingdom
Noble titles created in 1958
John Harding family